Michal Ciszek (born 22 January 1978) is a former Canadian professional tennis player.

Ciszek, who came to Canada from Poland, had career best rankings of 536 in singles and 366 in doubles.

During his career he made two ATP Challenger doubles semi-finals and featured in the doubles main draw of the 2002 Canada Masters in Toronto, as a wildcard pairing with Philip Gubenco.

Ciszek married tennis player Natalia Cretu.

ITF Futures titles

Doubles: (2)

References

External links
 
 

1978 births
Living people
Canadian male tennis players
Polish emigrants to Canada